Gregorio Ramarui was the first native Palauan to be ordained a priest in the Roman Catholic Church.

In February 1964, Ramarui was ordained a priest in Koror, Palau. His ordination was attended by Roman Catholic leaders from as far away as Pohnpei.

Ramarui left the Roman Catholic priesthood two years after his ordination.

References
Francis X. Hazel (2003). "The Catholic Church in Palau", The Catholic Church in Micronesia: Historical essays on the Catholic Church in the Caroline–Marshall Islands (Pohnpei, Federated States of Micronesia: Micronesian Seminar)
Micronesian Reporter, Feb–Apr. 1964, p. 9

Palauan Roman Catholic priests